The Ven. Arthur John Winnington-Ingram, MA (14 June 1888 – 1 June 1965) was Archdeacon of Hereford, England, from 1942 to 1958.

The son of Edward Winnington-Ingram, he was educated at Hereford Cathedral School, St John's College, Oxford and Wells Theological College; and ordained in 1913. He was Curate then Vicar of Corsham from 1921 to 1928; Principal of St Aidan's Theological College, Ballarat from 1921 to 1928; Vicar of Kimbolton from  1929 to 1936; Rural Dean of Leominster from 1934 to 1936; Prebendary of Hereford Cathedral from 1937 to 1961; and Rector of Ledbury from 1936 to 1945.

He is buried in the churchyard of St Swithun's, Headbourne Worthy.

Notes

1888 births
People educated at Hereford Cathedral School
Alumni of St John's College, Oxford
Alumni of Wells Theological College
Archdeacons of Hereford
1965 deaths